, known as  for short, is a Japanese manga series written and illustrated by Kanko Nakamura. An anime television series adaptation by Doga Kobo aired between October and December 2018.

Plot
Tsubame Kamoi, a former JSDF pilot who is attracted to young girls, takes on a job as a maid to look after Misha Takanashi, a Russian girl who recently lost her mother. The series follows Misha constantly having to deal with Tsubame's dubious behavior while occasionally seeing some of the good in her.

Characters

A Russian girl who has become a rebellious recluse following her mother's death. She is fearful of Tsubame's behavior and often tries to find ways to get rid of her. Mother had named her after Koguma no Mīsha anime series about 1980 Olympic mascot Misha.

An eye-patched ex-Air Self-Defense Force soldier who becomes the Takanashi family's maid. She has a fascination with little girls and thus becomes very attached to Misha.

Misha's classmate, who she nicknames "Washiwashi".

Misha's classmate who has a one-sided rivalry with her.

Another ex-JASDF soldier with a strong fascination for her fellow comrade Tsubame and responsible for having her crush quitting the air force for her masochistic obsession.

Misha's stepfather, who becomes over delighted when Misha shows him any kind of interest.

Misha's pet ferret.

Media

Manga
Kanko Nakamura launched the manga in Futabasha's seinen manga magazine Monthly Action on August 25, 2016. The first two chapters were originally published in Shinshokan's Hirari yuri publication under the name  between November 30, 2013 and March 29, 2014. The manga will end serialization on January 25, 2023. The manga is licensed in North America by Kaiten Books.

Anime
An anime television series adaptation was announced on April 11, 2018. The series aired in Japan between October 5 and December 21, 2018 on AT-X, Tokyo MX, KBS, BS11, Sun TV, TV Aichi, and TVQ Broadcasting Kyushu, and was simulcast by Crunchyroll. Medialink holds the license to the series in Southeast Asia and South Asia. The series is directed by Masahiko Ohta and written by Takashi Aoshima, with animation by studio Doga Kobo. Character designs for the series are provided by Jun Yamazaki. An original video animation was bundled with the series' fourth Blu-ray/DVD volume, released on April 24, 2019.

Notes

References

External links
  
  
 English publisher website
 

Anime series based on manga
Comedy anime and manga
Crunchyroll anime
Doga Kobo
Futabasha manga
Japanese LGBT-related animated television series
Medialink
Seinen manga
Yuri (genre) anime and manga